Cyclone Emma was an extratropical cyclone that passed through several mainly Central European countries, on Saturday March 1, 2008, killing at least twelve people in Austria, Germany, Poland and the Czech Republic. Major infrastructure disruptions and some injuries were also reported in Belgium, France, Switzerland, and the Netherlands.

A Lufthansa jet almost crashed attempting to land in crosswinds at Hamburg.

Meteorological context
On 28 February 2008, a low-pressure area formed near Newfoundland. Within a few hours, the depression had strengthened a lot, and had deepened to  near the Faroe Islands. On the evening of 29 February, the warm front reaches the German coast, causing great amounts of rain. It is followed around midnight by a cold front, which was shortly followed by violent winds.

Progression of the storm

Germany and the Netherlands are the first hit by the storm. In a number of German regions, these gusts push the authorities to stop the railway and car traffics. At the same time, the air traffic of the Amsterdam Airport Schiphol is greatly disturbed. On the seaside, the dam of the Hollandsche Ijssel is claused by precaution. In Belgium, firemen carry out a hundred interventions throughout the night, mainly due to trees being brought down by the wind.

The gusts quickly move towards Bavaria, causing a power outage for nearly 150,000 people. In the wake of the storm, the material damage is of considerable importance, with among other damages, trees were brought down, urban infrastructure and transport is damaged, and the power outage, which makes the authorities expect the financial toll of the storm to go up to "tens of millions euro in damage".
In North Rhine-Westphalia, more than a million cube meters of windthrow are reported to have been caused by the storm.

Aside from this, Germany is also the country that suffered the highest death toll, with 6 left dead.

On the morning of 1 March, as the storm is moving to the south-east, gusts cause two accidents. A tree falls on the Intercity-Express. Shortly after, an Airbus A320 of the Lufthansa nearly crashes on the runway of the airport of Hamburg. As the gusts destabilize the plane, the pilot barely manages to land.

In France, the region of Alsace is affected by the storm too. In the commune of Pfastatt, part of the roof of a supermarket is torn away, leading to a preventive evacuation.

In Austria, the storm pushes the government to cut access to several roads and motorways. Important damage is reported in a number of locations, while winds reaching  are measured in the Austrian Alps. In Salzburg and Vienna, winds reaching . In the latter, a crane falls down on the Südbahnhof and nearly 10,000 homes suffer from a power outage.

The A1 and A3 motorways are temporarily closed to traffic due to trees brought down on the roadways.

Poland is also affected by the storm. A train linking Warsaw and Kraków is cancelled due to security concerns, while important material damage and the death of two people are reported. Thousands of homes are also the victims of a power outage.

In the Czech Republic, the region of Prague is swept with winds reaching . In the capital city, the roof of a building is torn out, leading to the evacuation of forty residents. A power outage caused by damaged power lines affects 920,000 homes, which represents around 10% of the Czech population, and the railway traffic is heavily disturbed. The total cost of the storm in the country is estimated to be of several hundreds of million Czech crowns by the largest Czech assurance company, Ceska Pojistovna.
Two people are killed by the storm.

As the storm came to a close, floods caused by heavy rain affect several affected areas, like Bavaria.

Death toll
In Germany, five people died in traffic accidents caused by the weather conditions, while a sixth was crushed by a tree.
In Austria, two people fell victim to falling trees, while a third was swept away by a landslide. Shortly after, a man died in his caravan when it was swept away by the wind.
In Poland, two people died in traffic accidents caused by fallen trees and other fragments.
In the Czech Republic, an 11-year-old girl was crushed by a tree in Líbeznice, while a man in his eighties died after being hit by a corrugated plate torn out by the storm.

See also
Cyclone Carmen
Other storms named Emma

References

External links

List of European weather systems from the Free University of Berlin

2008 natural disasters
2008 in Europe
Emma
2008 meteorology
Emma
Emma
Emma
Emma
Emma
Emma
Emma
Emma
2008 in Austria
2008 in Germany
2008 in Poland
2008 in the Czech Republic
2008 in Belgium
2008 in France
2008 in Switzerland
2008 in the Netherlands
February 2008 events in Europe